Pennantia cunninghamii, known as brown beech, is a species of flowering plant in the family Pennantiaceae and is endemic to eastern Australia. It is a tree with a fluted trunk, elliptic or oblong leaves and white, either bisexual or male flowers.

Description 
Both sides of the leaves are glossy with prominent domatia on the veins.

Taxonomy
Pennantia cunninghamii was first formally described in 1852 by John Miers in The Annals and Magazine of Natural History from specimens collected by Allan Cunningham in the Illawarra region. The specific epithet honours Cunningham.

Distribution and habitat
Brown beech grows in rainforest from Clyde Mountain near Batemans Bay (35° S) in southern New South Wales to Atherton  (17° S) in tropical Queensland.

Ecology
The fruit of P. cunninghamii is eaten by grey-headed flying fox and a variety of bird species including brown cuckoo dove, green catbird, topknot pigeon, wompoo fruit-dove and white-headed pigeon. The larva of the moth Cardamyla carinentalis pupates between leaves of this species.

References

Apiales of Australia
Trees of Australia
Flora of New South Wales
Flora of Queensland
Pennantiaceae
Plants described in 1852